Takehara (written: 竹原 or 嵩原) is a Japanese surname. Notable people with the surname include:

, Ryukyuan bureaucrat
, Ryukyuan bureaucrat
, Japanese footballer
, Japanese baseball player
, Japanese boxer

Japanese-language surnames